This is a list of German television related events from 2000.

Events
18 February - Stefan Raab is selected to represent Germany at the 2000 Eurovision Song Contest with his song "Wadde hadde dudde da?". He is selected to be the forty-fifth German Eurovision entry during Countdown Grand Prix held at the Stadthalle in Bremen.
28 February - The German version of Big Brother debuts on RTL 2.
9 June - The first season of Big Brother Germany is won by John Mitz.
30 December - Alida-Nadine Kuras wins the second season of Big Brother Germany.

Debuts

Domestic
28 February - Big Brother Germany (2000–2011, 2015–present) (RTL II)
12 October - Donna Leon (2000–2019) (ARD)
14 November -  (2000) (ARD)

International
8 January - // Rainbow Fish (1998–2000) (Sat. 1)
12 March -  The Sopranos (1999–2007) (ZDF)
6 April - / Littlest Pet Shop (1995) (K-Toon)
25 April -  The Brothers Flub (1999–2000) (Super RTL)
29 April - // Anthony Ant (1999) (ZDF)
29 July - / Mona the Vampire (1999–2006) (ZDF)
4 September -  Futurama (1999-2003, 2008–2013) (ProSieben)
8 September - / Watership Down (1999–2001) (Super RTL)
8 October - / Eckhart (2000–2002) (Super RTL)
17 November -  Johnny Bravo (1997–2004) (ORF 1)

Military Television

Military Television Debuts

BFBS
14 January - / Rotten Ralph (1998–2001)
14 January - / Pocket Dragon Adventures (1998–1999)
25 January -  Yoho Ahoy (2000–2001)
12 July -  The Brothers Flub (1999–2000)
13 July - / Salty's Lighthouse (1997–1998)
14 July - / Mega Babies (1999–2000)
1 November -  Preston Pig (2000)
2 December -  My Fragile Heart (2000)
4 December -  Fetch the Vet (2000–2001)
// The Baskervilles (2000)
 The Magic Key (2000–2001)
/ Fly Tales (1999–2001)
 Sheeep (2000–2001)
 Meeow! (2000–2003)

Television shows

1950s
Tagesschau (1952–present)

1960s
 heute (1963-present)

1970s
 heute-journal (1978-present)
 Tagesthemen (1978-present)

1980s
Wetten, dass..? (1981-2014)
Lindenstraße (1985–present)

1990s
Gute Zeiten, schlechte Zeiten (1992–present)
Marienhof (1992–2011)
Unter uns (1994-present)
Verbotene Liebe (1995-2015)
Schloss Einstein (1998–present)
In aller Freundschaft (1998–present)
Wer wird Millionär? (1999-present)

Ending this year

Births

Deaths

See also 
2000 in Germany